Nemapogon agenjoi is a moth of the family Tineidae. It is found in France, Spain, Portugal and Italy.

References

Moths described in 1959
Nemapogoninae